Patrick McCarthy is an English conductor and singer.

McCarthy trained as a baritone singer at the Guildhall School of Music and Drama and the London Opera Centre, and came to public attention in 1974, during a performance of Carl Orff's Carmina Burana, conducted by André Previn at The Proms in the Royal Albert Hall.

McCarthy was in the audience when Thomas Allen (now Sir Thomas), the baritone soloist, fell ill during the performance, collapsing onto his chair and needing to be carried off by members of the orchestra. McCarthy went backstage and offered his services as a professional singer who was experienced with the piece. Given that the understudy for the part – a member of the choir – was, in fact, a doctor and therefore looking after Allen, his offer was accepted and McCarthy went onstage to complete the performance. He received a standing ovation.

In 1980, McCarthy re-located from London to Colchester. His voice had changed and he became a tenor singer, before moving to orchestral and choral conducting in 1992.

In that year he founded the Colchester Bach Choir and Orchestra, and he has also conducted the Ipswich Bach Choir and Chamber Orchestra, the Colchester Bach Choir and Orchestra and the Colchester Philharmonic, and for many years has been the Musical Director of The Witham Choral Society.

Recordings
"Vital Spark of Heav'nly Flame" (Hyperion, 1997)
"Haydn and his English Friends" (Hyperion, 1999)

References

Year of birth missing (living people)
Living people
British male conductors (music)
English tenors
English operatic baritones
21st-century British conductors (music)
21st-century British male musicians